CountrySTAT is a Web-based information technology system for food and agriculture statistics at the national and subnational levels. It provides decision-makers access to statistics across thematic areas such as production, prices, trade and consumption. This supports analysis, informed policy-making and monitoring with the goal of eradicating extreme poverty and hunger.

Since 2005, the Statistics Division of the United Nations Food and Agriculture Organization (FAO) has introduced CountrySTAT in over 20 countries in Latin America, sub-Saharan Africa and Asia.

Overview
The CountrySTAT web system is a browser oriented statistical framework to organise, harmonise and synchronise data collections. 
CountrySTAT aims are to facilitate data use by policy makers and researchers. It provides statistical standards, data exchange tools and related methods without using external data sources such as databases. The data source is a text file in a specific format, called px-file. The application supports many languages. The layout can be easily changed to match the needs of users.

Features
The CountrySTAT web system is easy to install and to operate on a standard Windows XP professional machine. It is programmed in ASP with visual basic using internet information service and suitable windows software for graphical and statistical output for the intranet and internet environment.

Criticisms
The programming with VB scripts, customised DLLs and additional windows software (PC-Axis family) makes it to a platform dependently software only run with the internet information server on a Windows server machine. To use it with the internet requires an own dedicated windows server.

See also
FAO
CountrySTAT technical documentation

External links
FAO Programme Committee (87th Session): Modernization of FAOSTAT – An update. Rome, 6-10 May 2002.
Website of FAO
CountrySTAT Web site
FAOSTAT Web site
FAO Statistics Division Web site

National CountrySTAT Web sites
 CountrySTAT Philippines
 CountrySTAT Bhutan
 CountrySTAT Mali
 CountrySTAT Niger
 CountrySTAT Togo
 RegionSTAT UEMOA
 CountrySTAT Angola
 CountrySTAT Benin
 CountrySTAT Burkina Faso
 CountrySTAT Ivory Coast
 CountrySTAT Cameroon
 CountrySTAT Ghana
 CountrySTAT Kenya
 CountrySTAT Senegal
 CountrySTAT Uganda 
 CountrySTAT United Republic of Tanzania

Agricultural databases
Organizations established in 1945
Food and Agriculture Organization
Statistical data sets

cs:Organizace pro výživu a zemědělství
da:FAO
de:Food and Agriculture Organization
es:Organización para la Alimentación y la Agricultura
eo:Organizaĵo pri Nutrado kaj Agrikulturo
fr:Organisation des Nations unies pour l'alimentation et l'agriculture
id:Organisasi Pangan dan Pertanian
it:FAO
nl:Voedsel- en Landbouworganisatie
ja:国際連合食糧農業機関
nn:FAO
pt:Organização das Nações Unidas para a Agricultura e a Alimentação
ru:Продовольственная и сельскохозяйственная организация ООН
tr:Gıda ve Tarım Teşkilatı
zh:联合国粮食及农业组织